George Shannon (1785–1836), the youngest member of the Lewis and Clark Expedition (not counting the infant Jean Baptiste Charbonneau), was born in Pennsylvania of Irish ancestry.  He joined the Corps of Discovery in August 1803, as one of the three men (and Seaman) from Pittsburgh recruited by Lewis as he was waiting for the completion of the voyage's vessels in the city.

On August 26, 1804, he was sent to retrieve two pack horses; he was separated from the party for sixteen days and nearly starved, as he went without food for twelve days except for some grapes and rabbits. At first he thought he was behind the expedition, so he sped up thinking he could catch up.  Then, getting hungry, he went downstream to look for a trading party he could stay with.

Shannon got lost again August 6, 1805, when the expedition was at the Three Forks. He was dispatched up a fork the party had named Wisdom (the middle fork was named Jefferson and the placid fork, Philanthropy). He rejoined the party after three days by backtracking to the forks and following the trail of the others.

In 1807 he was with a party led by Nathaniel Pryor that was attempting to return the Mandan chief Sheheke to his people. He was wounded in an encounter with the Arikaras and lost a leg; he would eventually receive a government pension.

In 1810 he assisted in Nicholas Biddle's history of the expedition. Later, Clark asked him to join a fur trading enterprise, but Shannon chose to study law instead. By 1818 he had a law practice in Lexington, Kentucky with Thomas T. Barr, a former Transylvania University trustee and Kentucky state legislator. That year, his assets included $700, one cow, and two enslaved people. By 1822, he owned his home, one horse, three cows, $2480, and six enslaved people. 

Later, ran for senator from Missouri. He was buried in Palmyra, Missouri.

His brothers were Congressman Thomas Shannon (Ohio politician) and Ohio/Kansas Governor[s]Wilson Shannon

Legacy
George Shannon is the namesake of Shannon County, Missouri.

In 2001, a number of northeastern Nebraska communities formed Shannon Trail Promoters, with the goal of increasing tourism in the forthcoming bicentennial year of the Lewis and Clark Expedition.  The organization commissioned thirteen wooden chainsaw sculptures of Shannon, which were placed in participating communities along a  Shannon Trail.  Sixteen wayside markers recounting aspects of Shannon's career were also placed along the trail, which runs through the region in which Shannon is thought to have wandered during his 1804 separation from the expedition.  In keeping with Shannon's claim to fame, a scavenger hunt was held, with tourists urged to "Find Private Shannon" by visiting all sixteen markers.  The organization continues to stage Shannon-themed events.

In 2007, when a new bridge was under construction to carry U.S. Highway 81 across the Missouri River from Cedar County, Nebraska to Yankton, South Dakota, one of the names proposed for it was the Private Shannon Bridge.  In an online poll, the name was selected by a plurality of those responding, garnering 26% of the votes.  However, the Yankton-based committee responsible for naming the bridge elected to call it the Yankton Discovery Bridge, a choice that did not sit well with Nebraskans.  The "Yankton" was eventually dropped from the name, and the bridge is now known as the Discovery Bridge.

Shannon is the subject of the poet Campbell McGrath's 2009 work Shannon: A Poem of the Lewis and Clark Expedition.  Shannon has been featured elsewhere in literature, film and television including Ken Burn’s Lewis and Clark where he was voiced by Tim Clark, Leon Martell’s Bea[u]tiful in the Extreme where he was portrayed by Andrew David James. He is also the central character in the historical fiction book My Travels with Capts. Lewis & Clark, by George Shannon written by Kate McMullan.  McMullan, a descendant of Shannon's, based the work on his actual journals.

George Shannon was one of the ¨9 men from Kentucky¨. - He was lost for 16 days (about 3 weeks).

References

External links
 Lewis and Clark Journals, Members of the Expedition (U. Nebraska)

1785 births
1836 deaths
American amputees
Lewis and Clark Expedition people
Transylvania University alumni
People from Pittsburgh